Tayyar Hain was the official anthem of the 2020 Pakistan Super League, the fifth season of the Pakistan Super League. It has been written by Zulfiqar Jabbar Khan (Xulfi), and sung by Ali Azmat, Haroon, Asim Azhar and Arif Lohar. It was released on 28 January by HBL Pakistan in collaboration with Pepsi Pakistan.

Background
The anthem was officially announced a day before its release. It was stated in the press release that the song will show the celebration of nation because Pakistan is ready to host all the matches of the league for the first time.

Xulfi commented, "The anthem, through its unifying melody, celebrates this very victory that's taken years to evolve to reach this point." He said that when he was approached for the song, the concept striked was "Tayyar Hain", and then they wrote the lyrics to define the readiness. He concluded that every singer and every musician with more than 20 instruments of multiple tastes, in the making of the anthem, worked by heart which, collectively, represents "our love for Pakistan, for PSL and for cricket".

Folk singer Arif Lohar, rock singer Ali Azmat, former Awaz singer Haroon Rashid and pop artist Asim Azhar were also happy, excited and proud to be the part of this song, all being cricket fans themselves. They are expected to perform in the opening ceremony on 20 February at National Stadium, Karachi.

Earlier in December 2019, it was rumoured that Atif Aslam is part of 2020 PSL anthem, which he denied.

Release 
An event held at a hotel in Lahore on 28 January 2020, which was attended by the Pakistan Cricket Board chairman Ehsan Mani and cricketers, as well as officials of PSL's all six franchises, media and sponsors. The song was presented to them before releasing officially and it was praised by all the stakeholders. Its music video has been directed by Kamal Khan of Pakistani film Laal Kabootar fame, and it stars cricketers Babar Azam, Hasan Ali, Rumman Raees, Sarfraz Ahmed, Shaheen Shah Afridi and Shan Masood.

The anthem released simultaneously on multiple platforms, including social media as well as major television networks across the country before 9:00 PM news bulletin.

Chairman PCB said that the "release of the anthem officially launches" marketing campaign for the season, adding praise to the PCB team "for their hard work in putting this together" so that he is confident that "this year's event will set new benchmarks and standards". Atif Rana, Javed Afridi, Alamgir Khan Tareen, Nadeem Omar, Ali Naqvi and Salman Iqbal; franchise officials of Lahore Qalandars, Peshawar Zalmi, Multan Sultans, Quetta Gladiators, Islamabad United, and Karachi Kings respectively, also praised the anthem and showed their readiness for the league.

Reception 
'Tayaar Hain' has received heavy criticism from listeners, particularly on social media. The backlash has led singer Asim Azhar to apologise for disappointing cricket fans.

Despite criticism, Tayyar Hain has become the most successful PSL Anthem in the history of PSL Anthems. It is the fastest PSL anthem to reach 5 million views on YouTube. The stats released by Pakistan Super League prove that the song has been the most successful one till date garnering fastest views, highest number of followers, highest watch time, and highest number of followers as well. The PSL 2020 anthem ‘Tayyar Hain’ has broken previous records in terms of digital views in the opening week of the tournament. As compared to previous anthems, it has added the most number of subscribers in just the first three weeks of its release.

See also 

 List of Pakistan Super League anthems
Mela Loot Liya

References

2020 Pakistan Super League
2020
2020 songs
Asim Azhar songs